Scorpionyssus is a genus of mites in the family Laelapidae.

Species
 Scorpionyssus heterometrus Fain & G. Rack, 1988

References

Laelapidae